Chio Min Secondary School or S.M.J.K. Chio Min is a government-controlled local Chinese high school located at Kulim in Kedah, Malaysia. It is the only high school in Kulim that places emphasis on education in Chinese language and values.

Background
Chio Min Secondary School was established in 1957, which extended from Chio Min Primary School, established on 10 May 1918. In 1942, the Chio Min School had to be closed due to the Japanese invasion. It reopened in 1945. In 1948, the number of students increased to 600 people and there were 100 students studying at night. Night class closed in 1963. In 1957, two new buildings were constructed and Chio Min Secondary School was started. In 1958, the Primary School was renamed Chio Min Chio Min Primary School A and School B. In 1964, the government issued a total of RM40,000 to build nine new classrooms. Prior to that, in South Kedah there were no Chinese secondary schools for Chinese primary school students to further their studies. Therefore, some people had set up a committee to collect donations from the public to build a new building with 30 classrooms. At that time, the school was located in the Klang Sago, Kulim, Kedah.

In August 2001, Chio Min Secondary School received 1.5 million Ringgit in government funding to build a new four-storey school building which officially opened on 15 January 2002. On 25 March, the first batch of form 6 classes (university preparation class) started. In April 2002, government funding helped to construct a two-story EPU computer room; construction started in April 2002. On 9 February 2003, the Chinese Orchestra was established. In 2004 the school was equipped with more than 100 computers, including computers in conference rooms, library reference room, computer room and the Office of Academic Affairs.

Examinations
Chio Min Secondary School has had success in public examinations such as Penilaian Menengah Rendah (PMR), Sijil Pelajaran Malaysia (SPM) and Sijil Tinggi Persekolahan Malaysia (STPM).

Notable alumni
 Ch'en Huei-hua- Chinese writer.
 Lim Mok-Hai- Chinese writer.
 Shang Wan Yun- Chinese writer.
 Dr Goh Bey Hing- Biochemist.

References

External links
 SMJK Chio Min - SMJK portal

Secondary schools in Malaysia
Educational institutions established in 1957
Schools in Kedah
1957 establishments in Malaya
Chinese-language schools in Malaysia